Sharon Fichman and Maria Sanchez were the defending champions, but chose not to participate.

Robin Anderson and Jessika Ponchet won the title, defeating Mélodie Collard and Leylah Annie Fernandez 7–6(9–7), 6–2 in the final.

Seeds

Draw

Draw

References
Main Draw

Tevlin Women's Challenger - Doubles
Tevlin Women's Challenger